Events from the year 1613 in France

Incumbents
 Monarch – Louis XIII
Regent: Marie de' Medici

Events

Births

Full date missing
François de La Rochefoucauld, writer (died 1680)
Claude Perrault, architect (died 1688)
André Le Nôtre, landscape architect, designed the park of the Palace of Versailles (died 1700)
Henri Albert de La Grange d'Arquien (died 1707)
Isaac de Benserade, poet (died 1691)

Deaths

Full date missing
Dominicus Baudius, poet (born 1561)
Mathurin Régnier, satirist (born 1573)
Jacques Guillemeau, surgeon (born 1550)
Martin Ruzé de Beaulieu, politician (born c.1526)

See also

References

1610s in France